is a Japanese film production company that is a subsidiary of Toho Co., Ltd. Founded in November 8, 1971 as , the company originally served as a spin-off of Toho's original production department, and produced over 160 films.

Works

Toho Pictures 

 Here Comes Golden Bat (1972)
 Bye-Bye Jupiter (1984)
 The Return of Godzilla (1984)
 Godzilla vs. Biollante (1989)
 Godzilla vs. King Ghidorah (1991)
 Godzilla vs. Mothra (1992)
 Chōshōjo Reiko (1991)
 Godzilla vs. King Ghidorah (1991)
 Godzilla vs. Mothra (1992)
 Godzilla vs. Mechagodzilla II (1993)
 Orochi, the Eight-Headed Dragon (1994)
 Godzilla vs. SpaceGodzilla (1994)
 Godzilla vs. Destoroyah (1995)
 Yatsuhaka-mura (1996)
 Rebirth of Mothra (1996)
 Rebirth of Mothra II (1997)
 Rebirth of Mothra III (1998)
 Godzilla 2000: Millennium (1999)
 Godzilla vs. Megaguirus (2000)
 Godzilla, Mothra and King Ghidorah: Giant Monsters All-Out Attack (2001)
 Godzilla Against Mechagodzilla (2002)
 Godzilla: Tokyo SOS (2003)
 Godzilla Final Wars (2004)
 Spring Snow (2005)
 As the Gods Will (2014)
 Attack on Titan (2015)
 Shin Godzilla (2016) [with Cine Bazar]
 Rage (2016)
 Murder at Shijinso (2019)
 Last Letter (2020)
 Love Me, Love Me Not (2020)

TOHO Studios 

 Brave: Gunjō Senki (2021)
 Shin Ultraman (2022) [with Cine Bazar]
 Untitled Toho Godzilla film (2023) [with Robot Communications]

References

External links 

 
 

Toho
Japanese film studios
Japanese companies established in 1971
Animation studios in Tokyo